Trianel Windpark Borkum (formerly Borkum West II) is an offshore wind farm near Borkum. Its first phase of 40 turbines rated at a total capacity of 200 MW is operational, with a planned, additional 200 MW in a second phase. The project was approved for construction in 2008 and will cost over €1 billion to construct once fully operational (€900m for phase I alone). Originally known as Borkum West II the name was changed to Trianel Windpark Borkum in early 2013.

Phase 1 of the installation was completed in the 4th quarter of 2014 and consist of 40 Areva M5000-116 turbines (5 MW turbines) on Tripod foundations. It was connected to the grid in August 2015. In the six months before March 2016 the wind farm produced 452.33 GWh, i.e. a capacity factor of 51.6%.

In September 2016 Senvion was awarded a conditional contract for the second phase, for 32 upgraded 6.2M152 turbines rated at a total capacity of 203 MW. A final investment decision was expected in the first half of 2017 after which construction could start in early 2018 for a planned completion in the fall of 2019. Cost is €184/MWh.

References

External links

Offshore wind farms in the North Sea
Wind farms in Germany
Borkum
2015 establishments in Germany
Energy infrastructure completed in 2015